NSW Koori Rugby League Knockout Carnival is one of the biggest Indigenous gatherings in Australia. The first knockout was held at Camdenville Park, St Peters, on the October long weekend of 1971 with seven participating teams. The winning team gains the right to host the next knockout. Organisers created the knockout to provide further access for Indigenous players to state rugby league.

The knockout celebrated its 50th anniversary in 2022.

History

Concept
The Knockout emerged from the new and growing mostly inner-city Sydney Aboriginal community in the late 1960s and early 1970s. The emerging political movement in Redfern for self-determination and justice, increased opportunities arising from post-referendum federal government initiatives and greater employment prospects in the industrial areas of Sydney influenced Aboriginal families' migration to the inner-city, particularly South Sydney. The Knockout emerged within this complex economic and social context. It was initiated by six men, and one woman, affiliated with Koorie United: Bob Smith, Bob Morgan, Bill Kennedy, Danny Rose, Victor Wright, the late George Jackson, and Barbara Flick. They formed Koorie United in response to the rapidly expanding Sydney Aboriginal community. The established Sydney-based Aboriginal sides, the Redfern All Blacks and La Perouse Panthers (or Blacks as they were sometimes called), were aligned with the South Sydney football district. There were many Aboriginal men looking for a game of football and so Koorie United formed joining the rival Newtown Jets district, with sponsorship from Marrickville Council, where some of the committee members worked.

The Koorie United committee were connected through kinship and the shared experience of relocating to the city. Bob Morgan, Danny Rose and Bill Kennedy hail from the New South Wales north-western town of Walgett in Gamilaroi country. Bob Smith and Victor Wright had relocated from Kemspey on the New South Wales north coast, and while the late George Jackson was based in Sydney, he also had connections with Gamilaroi as his wife was from Coonabarabran. Barbara Flick hails from Collarenebri.

Following a meeting at the Clifton Hotel, a well-known gathering place for Kooris in Redfern in the 1960s & 70s, the Koorie United committee proposed holding a statewide Knockout competition. Prior to this there had been many town-based knockout football and basketball competitions. However, the establishment of the Knockout set out with some different objectives. Bob Morgan says:Our concept at the time was to also have a game where people who had difficulty breaking into the big time would be on show. They could put their skills on show and the talent scouts would come and check them out.

The Knockout was formed with a view to providing a stage for the many talented Aboriginal footballers playing at the time who had been overlooked by the talent scouts. Although there were some notable exceptions, like Bruce (La Pa) Stewart playing on the wing for Easts and field goal specialist, Eric Simms, with South Sydney, Aboriginal footballers experienced difficulty breaking into the big time. It was thought the Knockout would provide a chance for Aboriginal footballers to get noticed, where for reasons of racism and lack of country-based recruitment they were overlooked. There was also some talk of entering an all-Aboriginal side in the National Rugby League competition. But the instigation of the Knockout was intended to be far more than sporting competition, as original committee member Bob Morgan said:The Knockout was never simply about football, it was about family, it was about community, it was getting people to come together and enjoy and celebrate things rather than win the competition football.

The first knockout
In 1971 Koorie United hosted the first knockout at Camdenville Park, St Peters, which attracted seven teams: Koorie United, Redfern All Blacks, Kempsey, La Perouse, Walgett, Moree and a combined Mt Druitt / South Coast side. It was won by La Perouse United. The tournament remained at St Peters until 1975.

Venues
With Kempsey winning the Knockout in 1975, the first non-Sydney side, it was decided that the winning team would host the Knockout the following year, and the tradition began.

The Kempsey Knockout was a memorial to the late Victor Wright Senior, a long-time supporter of the Knockout and of Aboriginal Football. The original winning trophy was donated by the Foundation for Aboriginal Affairs.

The inscription on the trophy reads, NSW Koorie Sports Committee Annual Football Knockout Perpetual Trophy, donated by the Foundation of Aboriginal Affairs.

BAC Walgett became the first team to win the Knockout on three consecutive occasions. Their first win in 1988 (at Newcastle) resulted in some controversy regarding the tradition of the winner hosting the carnival, questioning the capacity of a small remote country township (population around 2200) to stage such a major event. With upwards of 6000 footballers, 50-odd teams and officials, supporters and family coming to town in 1989 for the  three-day carnival, the Walgett community carried the day and went on to win it again at Walgett in 1990. The BAC management team chose to stage the carnival in Sydney in 1991 for its 21st anniversary.

Knockout winners

Open Men

Open Women

Under 17 Boys

Under 16 Girls

Koori vs. Murri Interstate Challenge
The QLD Murri vs. NSW Koori Interstate Challenge is an annual rugby league game played between the winners of the NSW Koori Knockout and Murri Rugby League Carnival.

Festival of Indigenous Rugby League

2014 Festival of Indigenous Rugby League
The NRL launched a Festival of Indigenous Rugby League program to take the place of the prestigious pre-season Rugby League All Stars game following every World Cup year. The 2014 Festival of Indigenous Rugby League featured a trial match between the Newcastle Knights and an Indigenous team, drawn from the NSW Koori Rugby League Knockout and Murri Rugby League Carnival in Queensland, as well as the NRL Indigenous Player Cultural Camp, Murri vs Koori women's and Under 16s representative games, a Murri v Koori match, a jobs expo and community visits.

2018 Festival of Indigenous Rugby League
2018 Festival of Indigenous Rugby League created a strong connection between the Maori, Aboriginal and Torres Strait Islanders. The First Nations Goannas are chosen from the Koori Knockout and the Murri Carnival. With a strong showcase of cultural celebration from both teams. The 2018 Festival of Indigenous Rugby League was held at Redfern Oval featuring a Double header between the First Nation Goannas v NZ Maori and First Nation Gems v NZ Maori Ferns, And a curtain raiser game for the Koori vs Murri Interstate challenge Between Newcastle Yowies and Dhadin Geai Warriors .

Leader board

Trophies
Throughout the history of the Knockout there have been many trophies added. Many of the trophies are memorials. Some of these trophies are dedicated to those who have made a significant contribution to the Knockout and Aboriginal football. These include the William Peachey Memorial Trophy – donated by the Peache family; the Lance Brown Memorial Trophy presented to Bourke/Weilmoringle RLFC, Gary "Mad Mick" Kennedy; McGrady Memorial Shield; Tommo Tighe Memorial Shield; Tabulam Rugby League Football Club Paul Roberts Memorial Shield; Wesley McGrady Memorial Trophy; Vincent Clyde Donovan Memorial Trophy – donated by the South Taree Footballers for the best 5/8 of State Knockout; and the George "Pedro" Squires Perpetual Trophy – donated by the Greenup Family Bowraville.

NRL players to play in Koori Knockout
 Josh Addo-Carr - Redfern All Blacks
 Matthew Allwood - Redfern All Blacks
 Ben Barba – Walgett Aboriginal Connection
 Nathan Blacklock
 Maurice Blair - Newcastle Yowies
 Matt Bowen - Newcastle Yowies
 Braidon Burns
 Preston Campbell
 Adrian Davis - Newcastle Yowies & Kempsey Bloodlines
 Justin Doyle - Narwan Eels & La Perouse
 Leo Dynevor
 Dylan Farrell - La Perouse Panthers 
 Blake Ferguson 
 Andrew Fifita – Griffith 3 Ways United & Doonside Brown Bears 
 David Fifita – Griffith 3 Ways United & Doonside Brown Bears 
 Latu Fifita – Griffith 3 Ways United & Doonside Brown Bears 
 Dane Gagai - Newcastle Yowies
 Craig Garvey - La Perouse Panthers 
 Steve Gordon - Newcastle Yowies
 Yileen Gordon - Newcastle Yowies
 Nicho Hynes – Griffith Three Ways United 
 Greg Inglis – Wall St Warriors
 Ryan James
 Rod Jensen – Walgett Aboriginal Connection
 Ben Jones – Walgett Aboriginal Connection
 Albert Kelly - Newcastle Yowies & Nulla Rugby League Club 
 Daine Laurie
 Brenko Lee - Newcastle Yowies
 Michael Lett
 Cliff Lyons
 Nathan Merritt – Redfern All-Blacks
 Latrell Mitchell - Taree Biripi Sharks
 Denis Moran - Narwan Eels & Newcastle Yowies
 Anthony Mundine - Nanima Connections
 Wes Patten - Redfern All Blacks & Newcastle Yowies
 David Peachey
 Tyrone Peachey - Nanima Connections
 Jesse Ramien - Kempsey Bloodlines
 Amos Roberts
 James Roberts - Kempsey Bloodlines
 Tyrone Roberts - Cabbage Tree Island 
 Tyrone Roberts-Davis - Kempsey Bloodlines
 Reece Robinson - Redfern All Blacks
 Travis Robinson - Redfern All Blacks 
 George Rose – Walgett Aboriginal Connection
 Chris Sandow - Narrandera Wiradjuri Warriors 
 Eric Simms
 Robbie-John Simpson – Griffith Three Ways United 
 Will Smith - Newcastle All Blacks
 Timana Tahu – Newcastle Yowies
 Gorden Tallis - Redfern All Blacks
 Ashley Taylor - Newcastle Yowies
 Sam Thaiday - Wollumbin Warriors
 Joel Thompson - Walgett Aboriginal Connection
 Brad Tighe - Newcastle Yowies
 Darrell Trindall - Redfern All Blacks
 Travis Waddell - Newcastle Yowies
 Ricky Walford - Barwon Aboriginal Corporation
 Cody Walker Cabbage Tree Island & Walgett Aboriginal Connection
 Connor Watson - Walgett Aboriginal Connection
 Dean Widders - Narwan Eels & Redfern All Blacks
 Jonathan Wright - Campbelltown Ghosts & Redfern All Blacks

See also

 Australian Aboriginal culture
 Indigenous Australian sport
 List of Indigenous Australian firsts

References

1971 establishments in Australia
Recurring sporting events established in 1971
Sports leagues established in 1971
Indigenous Australian sport
Rugby league competitions in New South Wales